Keratam is a 2011 Indian Telugu film directed by Gautham Patnaik and produced by S. V. Babu. The film was simultaneously made in Tamil as Yuvan by director R. N. Saran. The film stars Siddharth Rajkumar, Aishwarya Devan and Rakul Preet Singh in the lead roles. A remake of the Kannada film Josh (2009), the films featured music composed by Joshua Sridhar and were released in August 2011. The bilingual version had Rakul making her Tamil & Telugu language debuts respectively.

Cast

Production
A remake of the Kannada film Josh (2009), the bilingual Telugu and Tamil project was launched by Kannada producer S. V. Babu. It marked the acting debut of Siddharth Rajkumar, a nephew of actor Krishnam Raju and a cousin of Prabhas. The film also marked the debut of actresses Rakul Preet Singh and Aishwarya Devan in the Tamil and Telugu film industries, and it became the first project the actresses had signed in either language.

The Telugu version of the film was directed by Gautham Patnaik, the brother of renowned music composer R. P. Patnaik. The Telugu version has been shot in Hyderabad, Bangalore, Chennai and Goa. Production for the Telugu film was completed by June 2011.

The director of the original Kannada film, Shivamani, was approached to make the Tamil version but his refusal meant that newcomer R. N. Saran worked on the project. A song for the Tamil version of the film was shot in August 2011 in a secluded area of Goa, where the team of Ek Duuje Ke Liye (1981) had earlier shot.

Soundtrack 
Songs composed by Joshua Sridhar.
Keratam
"Sometimes Nelapaina" - Vijay Prakash, Suvi, Vijay Narayan, Rita
"Saadhyamena" - Karthik, Shweta Mohan
"Hey! Oka Merupai" - Benny Dayal
"Vayase Nidura" - Naresh Iyer, Padmapriya
"Nidure Chedire" - Karthik
"Fashion Show" - Vijay Narayan, Rita
"Nee Navvula" - Deepu, Gayathri

Yuvan
"Thear Ival Eval Kattumum" - Benny Dayal
"Vanmegam Enn Vazhili" - Karthik, Shweta Menon
"Nilave Naanum" - Naresh Iyer, Padmapriya
"Fashion Show" - Vijay Narayan, Rita
"Nizhalum Tholaivil" - Karthik
"Sollu Petchu Ketka".

Release
Regarding the Telugu version, a reviewer from The Hindu noting that "The film has been handled well but is very formulaic." Regarding the Tamil version, a critic from Dinamalar praised the film's intent while calling the film's comedy scenes a minus point.

References

2011 films
2010s Telugu-language films
2010s Tamil-language films
Indian coming-of-age films
Indian multilingual films
Films scored by Joshua Sridhar
Tamil remakes of Kannada films
Telugu remakes of Kannada films
2011 multilingual films
2010s coming-of-age films